Friedrich Rühs (1781-1820) was a German historian of Scandinavian and Germanic history. At the time of the Liberation War he wrote xenophobic anti-French and anti-Jewish nationalist texts, and is seen as a forerunner of volkish anti-semitism.

Works
 Geschichte Schwedens, 5 Bände, Halle 1803–1814 (schwed. Übersetzung: 1823-25)
 Finnland und seine Bewohner, Greifswald 1809
 Entwurf einer Propädeutik des historischen Studiums [1811], Neuauflage (Band 7 der Reihe Wissen und Kritik) hg. und eingeleitet v. Dirk Fleischer u. Hans Schleier, Waltrop 1997.
 Über den Ursprung der Isländischen Poesie, Berlin 1813
 Historische Entwickelung des Einflusses Frankreichs und der Franzosen auf Deutschland und die Deutschen, Berlin 1815
 Über die Ansprüche der Juden auf das deutsche Bürgerrecht, Berlin 1815
 Das Verhältnis Holsteins und Schleswigs zu Deutschland und Dänemark, Berlin 1817
 Handbuch der Geschichte des Mittelalters (Neue verbesserte Auflage: Arnold, Stuttgart 1840)

As editor 
 Carl Gustaf af Leopold (Autor): Schwedens neueste Verhältnisse, Greifswald 1804
 Carl Gustaf af Leopold (Autor): Vermischte prosaische Schriften, Rostock/Leipzig 1805
 Gustav III. (Autor): Werke in drei Bänden, Berlin 1805–1808
 Edda, nebst einer Einleitung über die nordische Poesie und Mythologie, Berlin 1812

1781 births
1820 deaths
19th-century German historians
Germanic studies scholars
Old Norse studies scholars